Claes Wahlestedt, M.D., Ph.D., is a Swedish-American biomedical researcher and entrepreneur. He is a professor at the University of Miami.

Education
A native of Sweden, Wahlestedt obtained his MD and PhD degrees from the University of Lund. He pursued postdoctoral work at Kyoto University and Georgetown University. He grew up in Karlskrona, the son of Åke and Irena Wahlestedt. His father, a lawyer and a decorated former Swedish diplomat, had served in Berlin during the second world war.

Research
Wahlestedt has authored some 300 scientific publications as well as many patents in the fields of biotechnology, genomics and drug discovery. Much of Wahlestedt's career has been devoted to the exploration of non-protein-coding functional elements in the human genome. He is the inventor of the so-called AntagoNAT oligonucleotide technology, which allows for upregulation of genes in genetic and other disorders. Much earlier, in the early 1990s, his team first demonstrated efficacy and utility of antisense oligonucleotides applied directly to the brain (intracerebroventricular or intrathecal). There are today a number of human clinical trials based upon intrathecal or other delivery of oligonucleotides to the brain, including the recent FDA approval of Spinraza. Wahlestedt's team, with collaborators, introduced the now widespread use of locked nucleic acids in oligonucleotides (antisense and later siRNAs). A number of small molecule drugs have also been discovered by or under Wahlestedt's direction.

Career
Currently, at the University of Miami, Wahlestedt is Leonard Miller Professor and Associate Dean for Therapeutic Innovation. Previously, he was a founding faculty member and director of neuroscience research at the Florida campus of The Scripps Research Institute (2005-2011). Before that he was an endowed professor and department chair at the Karolinska Institute in Stockholm (1997-2005), and the founder of the Center for Genomics and Bioinformatics. He has also been a faculty member at Cornell University Medical College and at McGill University. Previously in his career, he spent more than a decade directing large drug discovery and biotechnology teams in the pharmaceutical industry for AstraZeneca (having been the founder of AstraZeneca Research Centre Montreal) and Pharmacia/Pfizer. In recent years he has co-founded several biotechnology companies, including CuRNA Inc., which was acquired by OPKO Health in 2011, Epigenetix Inc. and Jupiter Orphan Therapeutics.

References

External links 
 

Living people
University of Miami faculty
Year of birth missing (living people)
Lund University alumni